Family Pack may refer to:

Family Pack (2000 film), a French-Balgian drama film directed by Chris Vander Stappen
Family Pack (2022 film), an Indian comedy film directed by Arjun Kumar S.